Anaphe dempwolffi is a moth of the  family Notodontidae. It was described by Strand in 1909. It is found in Tanzania.

References

 Natural History Museum Lepidoptera generic names catalog

Endemic fauna of Tanzania
Notodontidae
Moths described in 1909
Moths of Africa